Poeira de Estrelas is a 1948 Brazilian musical comedy film directed by Moacyr Fenelon. It stars Lourdinha Bittencourt and Emilinha Borba.

References

External links
 

1948 films
1948 musical comedy films
Brazilian musical comedy films
Brazilian black-and-white films